Kapsaon is a kalenjin term meaning "a place of loud sound".
It refers to a small sub village located in Nandi County, Kenya. It is a small county with fewer than 1000 residents.

It is a small village but has produced more than 10 graduates in engineering and medicine. They attended the University of Nairobi, others attended Kenyatta University, Egerton University, Moi University as well as Jomo Kenyatta University of Agriculture and Technology and other  institutions.

Populated places in Nandi County